The 1921 Argentine Primera División was the 30th season of top-flight football in Argentina. Huracán won its first AFA league title while Racing won the dissident Asociación Amateur championship.

Final tables

Asociación Argentina de Football - Copa Campeonato

Banfield disaffiliated from the association moving to the rival Asociación Amateurs de Football with a few fixtures disputed.

Asociación Amateurs de Football

Racing Club won its 8th title. General Mitre, which had debuted at Primera after promoting last year, was expelled from the association after playing 17 fixtures and all its matches annulled.

Notes

References

Argentine Primera División seasons
1921 in Argentine football
1921 in South American football